Lenny Waronker (born October 3, 1941) is an American record producer and music industry executive. As the president of Warner Bros. Records, and later, as the co-chair of DreamWorks Records, Waronker was noted for his commitment to artists and his belief that "music, not money, was still number one."

Early life and education 
Waronker was born to a Jewish family in 1941 in Los Angeles, California, United States, and grew up in Pacific Palisades, California.  His father, Simon Waronker, a classical violinist, performed with the 20th Century Fox Orchestra from 1936 through 1939, and served as the orchestra's contractor at the studio from 1939 to 1955.  When Waronker was 13, his father founded Liberty Records (he was the inspiration for one of the Chipmunks being named "Simon").  With a roster that included Julie London, Johnny Burnette, Eddie Cochran, The Chipmunks, Bobby Vee, Jan and Dean, Johnny Duffy and the Ventures, Liberty became one of the most successful independent labels of the post-World War II period. Liberty's first release was an orchestral composition entitled "The Girl Upstairs" by Lionel Newman. Newman's nephew Randy Newman and Waronker – raised in the same neighborhood – were close friends.  They frequently visited the Liberty Records office, where they would watch recording sessions and study studio personnel.  Waronker had little interest in becoming a musician, and gravitated instead towards production.  "I remember going to Randy's house and saying 'why don't we figure out the arrangement for some standard?'  And it was just amazing:  He'd take any odd standard song and he'd sit down and mess with it and come up with a pop arrangement," he said in a 1994 interview with Billboard.

Career 
At his father's urging, Waronker –  by then educated in songwriting, the music industry, and publishing – attended USC, where he studied music and business.  As he had in high school, Waronker worked in the A&R department at Liberty during summer breaks. Notably, in addition to serving as a gofer,  Waronker worked with staff producer Snuff Garrett.  Garrett, who was legendary for his "shrewd ability to identify a good song and know what singer could do it justice" heavily influenced Waronker as he learned about production.

Waronker was additionally exposed to songwriters including Burt Bacharach, Mort Shuman, Carole King, Gerry Goffin, Barry Mann, Cynthia Weil, and Doc Pomus.

After his college graduation in 1961,  Waronker was employed by Liberty full-time, working in the label's promotion department. A year later,  he transferred to Liberty's publishing arm, Metric Music, where he worked for Mike Gould and, briefly, as an assistant to Tommy LiPuma.  At Metric, Waronker produced song demos; out of a fear that the producers would "mess up the song or the arrangement", Waronker learned how to make the demos sound like fully produced records with limited funds, and how to take advantage of "moments within a song".

{{Reduced pull quote|left|Whatever success I've had as a songwriter, I guess I have to trace back to my friendship with Lenny Waronker. His father played in the orchestra at Fox when my Uncle was there, so I know Lenny since I was one. He's two years older than me. I remember when I was four or five, he would tell me stories. I would be the audience. He would say, 'Let's ride on this tricycle.' He'd get on the back and I would pull him, and we'd fall off. I would get hurt and he wouldn't. I still have scars from that tricycle. He'd say, 'We can do this, we can do that,' and I would be the one who ended up getting smashed. And it was that way with songwriting. I was studying classical music, and Lenny said, 'Why don't you try writing some songs?''' Randy Newman}}

At Metric, Waronker pitched songs to Dick Glasser at Warner Bros. and Jimmy Bowen at Reprise. Impressed by his song demos, Bowen and Glasser recommended Waronker to Reprise label president Mo Ostin.  Ostin subsequently hired him as a junior A&R representative for Reprise and for Warner Bros., which was then run by Joe Smith.  Charged with developing artists who were originally on the roster of Autumn Records, a defunct label Reprise had acquired, Waronker produced the Mojo Men's "Sit Down, I Think I Love You," hiring Newman on piano and Van Dyke Parks as an arranger. He also produced Harpers Bizarre's "The 59th Street Bridge Song (Feelin' Groovy)," which he hired Leon Russell to arrange.  Both songs were hits.

At the time, Warner/Reprise was characterized by a roster which included Dean Martin, Frank Sinatra, Petula Clark, Peter, Paul & Mary, and Sonny and Cher.  The perception of the label shifted as Ostin and Smith signed artists including Jimi Hendrix, The Kinks, the Grateful Dead, and Van Morrison, among many others, and Waronker signed and/or produced artists including Newman, the Beau Brummels, James Taylor, Arlo Guthrie, Van Dyke Parks, Ry Cooder, Gordon Lightfoot, and Maria Muldaur.

In 1970 Ostin promoted Waronker to head of A&R.  Waronker assembled an A&R staff composed of acclaimed producers and artists including Tommy LiPuma, Ted Templeman, Russ Titelman, Steve Barri, Gary Katz, Michael Omartian and John Cale, and by the early 1980s,  Ostin, Smith and Waronker had transformed Warner/Reprise into a label known as a haven for artists.   Rickie Lee Jones, who Waronker signed on the strength of a four-song demo,  was an example of the success of the Warner Bros. artist-centric philosophy; her debut album, which Waronker co-produced with Titelman, went multi-platinum, and was considered by many to be one of the best debut albums of all time.  Although the singles charts at the time was dominated by disco and arena rock anthems, "Chuck E.'s In Love" was a Top 10 hit.  Jones won the Grammy for Best New Artist in 1979 and Waronker was nominated for a Grammy in the Record of the Year category for his work as the record's producer. (He was nominated in the same category in 1975 for Maria Muldaur's "Midnight at the Oasis.")

In 1982, Waronker determined that his A&R-focused role was limiting and "becoming tiresome." He went to Ostin, seeking to become more active as an executive at the label.  Waronker was subsequently installed as president. Although he remained significantly involved in signing artists, and produced tracks including Rod Stewart's "Broken Arrow" and Eric Clapton's "Forever Man," he reduced the amount of time he spent in the studio, and instead worked closely with Ostin to run Warner/Reprise.

With an emphasis on the quality of the records they released, under the joint leadership of Ostin and Waronker, Warner/Reprise entered a period of substantial commercial success. Although many of the label's artists failed to deliver records in 1983, in 1984, with multi-platinum records from Madonna, John Fogerty, and Prince, among others, the label posted a 51% increase in revenue.  Warner/Reprise continued to thrive throughout the 1980s, with releases from R.E.M. and Prince, both of whom Waronker signed, Eric Clapton, Red Hot Chili Peppers, Paul Simon, Madonna, Talking Heads, Van Halen, Neil Young, and Dire Straits, among others. Through meticulous A&R, Warner/Reprise continued to be recognized for the quality of their roster, and with aggressive marketing, the company remained a dominant force in the market during Waronker's tenure.

In 1992, following the death of Time Warner Chairman Steve Ross,  the Chairman of Warner Music Group, Robert J. Morgado, reorganized the corporate management structure. Under Ross, the Warner Music Groups were autonomous; Morgado, described as "a bean counter with little knowledge of music," required that the label heads report to him.  Ostin declined to renew his contract as Chairman of Warner/Reprise, and resigned his position in August 1994.  Waronker rejected Morgado's offer to succeed Ostin as the chairman of Warner Bros./Reprise.  "The way things are right now, it just doesn't feel right," he said.

In the months following their departure, Ostin and Waronker were pursued by more than a dozen entertainment companies, including Disney, Viacom, Fox, PolyGram and Time Warner.  In October it was announced that they would co-chair DreamWorks Records, the newly created music arm of Steven Spielberg, David Geffen, and Jeffrey Katzenberg's DreamWorks. Michael Ostin was appointed president of the label.

Although he served in a leadership role at DreamWorks, Waronker continued to work closely with artists including Rufus Wainwright, the first artist he signed to DreamWorks, the Eels, Elliott Smith, and Newman, who he brought to the label in 1998.  With artists such as Nelly Furtado, Morphine, and Propellerheads, DreamWorks embraced the same artistry-first principles that Warner Bros. had become known for, and by 2003, despite the vast changes in the landscape of the music industry, DreamWorks had flourished, with 59 gold, platinum and multiplatinum sales certifications and 26 Grammy award-winning releases.  The label was purchased by Universal Music Group for $100 million, and was subsequently folded into Geffen Records.  Waronker left DreamWorks several years later.

In 2010, at the invitation of then-Chairman Tom Whalley, Waronker returned to Warner Bros. as a consultant, and works in partnership with the company's A&R staff on selected projects which have included records by Gary Clark Jr., Kimbra, and Jenny Lewis.

 Personal life 
Waronker lives in Los Angeles. He was married to Shindig!'' star Donna Loren, with whom he had three children, including songwriter and That Dog founder, Anna Waronker, and drummer, Joey, as well as a second daughter, Katie. His second marriage to jewelry designer, Cathleen Waronker, with whom he had two children, Lily and Grace, ended in divorce.  He has five grandchildren.

Waronker serves on the board of directors of the USC Thornton School of Music.

Selected discography

References 

Record producers from California
A&R people
Living people
American people of German-Jewish descent
USC Thornton School of Music alumni
1941 births